The Emesini is a tribe of thread-legged bugs.

Partial list of genera

Chinemesa
Emesa
Eugubinus
Gardena
Myiophanes
Phasmatocoris
Polauchenia
Stenolemus
Stenolemoides

References

External links
 

Reduviidae
Hemiptera tribes